Frédérique Andrianaivo (born 12 July 1948) is a Malagasy sprinter. He competed in the men's 400 metres at the 1972 Summer Olympics.

References

External links

1948 births
Living people
Athletes (track and field) at the 1972 Summer Olympics
Malagasy male sprinters
Olympic athletes of Madagascar
Place of birth missing (living people)